NY30, NY-30, NY 30 or New York 30 may refer to:
 New York's 30th congressional district, a congressional district
 New York State Route 30, a state highway
 New York 30, a 1905 sailboat from N. G. Herreshoff